Gwangsan District (Gwangsan-gu) is a district, similar to a ward, situated in the city of Gwangju, South Korea. The total population of the district, as of September 2004, is 295,294, and the population density of the district is 1,085 per 1 km.  Its area is about 45% of the city of Gwangju.

The district bird is the White Heron, the district flower is Magnolia, and the district tree is the Pine Tree.
Gwangsan-gu has 1913 Songseong Market, and Songseong Market(held every 3,8day), Yonga birthplace, and there has Korean wheat festival.

Sister cities
 Jinnan, China

References

External links
Website of District